Mild cognitive impairment (MCI) is a neurocognitive disorder which involves cognitive impairments beyond those expected based on an individual's age and education but which are not significant enough to interfere with instrumental activities of daily living. MCI may occur as a transitional stage between normal aging and dementia, especially Alzheimer's disease. It includes both memory and non-memory impairments. The cause of the disorder remains unclear, as well as both its prevention and treatment, with some 50 percent of people diagnosed with it going on to develop Alzheimer's disease within five years.  The diagnosis can also serve as an early indicator for other types of dementia, although MCI may remain stable or even remit.

Mild cognitive impairment has been relisted as mild neurocognitive disorder in DSM-5, and in ICD-11, the latter effective on 1 January 2022.

Classification
MCI can present with a variety of symptoms, but is divided generally into two types.

Amnestic MCI (aMCI) is mild cognitive impairment with memory loss as the predominant symptom; aMCI is frequently seen as a prodromal stage of Alzheimer's disease. Studies suggest that these individuals tend to progress to probable Alzheimer's disease at a rate of approximately 10% to 15% per year. It is possible that being diagnosed with cognitive decline may serve as an indicator of MCI.

Nonamnestic MCI (naMCI) is mild cognitive impairment in which impairments in domains other than memory (for example, language, visuospatial, executive) are more prominent. It may be further divided as nonamnestic single- or multiple-domain MCI, and these individuals are believed to be more likely to convert to other dementias (for example, dementia with Lewy bodies).

The International Classification of Diseases classifies MCI as a "mental and behavioural disorder."

Causes
Mild cognitive impairment (MCI) may be caused due to alteration in the brain triggered during early stages of Alzheimer's disease or other forms of dementia. Exact causes of MCI are unknown. It is controversial whether MCI even should be identified as a disorder.

Risk factors of both dementia and MCI are considered to be the same: these are aging, genetic (heredity) cause of Alzheimer's or other dementia, and cardiovascular disease.

Individuals with MCI have increased oxidative damage in their nuclear and mitochondrial brain DNA.

Diagnosis 
The diagnosis of MCI requires considerable clinical judgement, and as such a comprehensive clinical assessment including clinical observation, neuroimaging, blood tests and neuropsychological testing are best in order to rule out an alternate diagnosis. 
MCI is diagnosed when there is: 
 Evidence of memory impairment
 Preservation of general cognitive and functional abilities
 Absence of diagnosed dementia

Neuropathology 
Although amnestic MCI patients may not meet criteria for Alzheimer's disease, patients may be in a transitional stage of evolving Alzheimer's disease.

Magnetic resonance imaging can observe deterioration, including progressive loss of gray matter in the brain, from mild cognitive impairment to full-blown Alzheimer disease.  A technique known as PiB PET imaging is used to show the sites and shapes of beta amyloid deposits in living subjects using a 11C tracer that binds selectively to such deposits.

Treatment 

 there are no USFDA-approved medications for the treatment of mild cognitive impairment.  Moreover, as of January 2018, there is no high-quality evidence that supports the efficacy of any pharmaceutical drugs or dietary supplements for improving cognitive symptoms in individuals with mild cognitive impairment. A moderate amount of high-quality evidence supports the efficacy of regular physical exercise for improving cognitive symptoms in individuals with MCI. The clinical trials that established the efficacy of exercise therapy for MCI involved twice weekly exercise over a period of six months. A small amount of high-quality evidence supports the efficacy of cognitive training for improving some measures of cognitive function in individuals with mild cognitive impairment.  Due to the heterogeneity among studies which assessed the effect of cognitive training in individuals with MCI, there are no particular cognitive training interventions that have been found to provide greater symptomatic benefits for MCI relative to other forms of cognitive training.

The American Academy of Neurology's (AAN) clinical practice guideline on mild cognitive impairment from January 2018 stated that clinicians should identify modifiable risk factors in individuals with MCI, assess functional impairments, provide treatment for any behavioral or neuropsychiatric symptoms, and monitor the individual's cognitive status over time. It also stated that medications which cause cognitive impairment should be discontinued or avoided if possible. Due to the lack of evidence supporting the efficacy of cholinesterase inhibitors in individuals with MCI, the AAN guideline stated that clinicians who choose to prescribe them for the treatment of MCI must inform patients about the lack of evidence supporting this therapy. The guideline also indicated that clinicians should recommend that individuals with MCI engage in regular physical exercise for cognitive symptomatic benefits; clinicians may also recommend cognitive training, which appears to provide some symptomatic benefit in certain cognitive measures.

According to research conducted in England, people with MCI often do not receive adequate care and support in healthcare settings. This leaves them and their families in a limbo with uncertainty regarding their futures and the fear of possibly developing dementia. The lack of services also fails to point them to effective ways to prevent dementia such as exercise and social contact. Successful dementia prevention services would have to be tailored to people's preferences and backgrounds.

As MCI may represent a prodromal state to clinical Alzheimer's disease, treatments proposed for Alzheimer's disease, such as antioxidants and cholinesterase inhibitors, could potentially be useful; however, as of January 2018, there is no evidence to support the efficacy of cholinesterase inhibitors for the treatment of mild cognitive impairment. Two drugs used to treat Alzheimer's disease have been assessed for their ability to treat MCI or prevent progression to full Alzheimer's disease.  Rivastigmine failed to stop or slow progression to Alzheimer's disease or to improve cognitive function for individuals with mild cognitive impairment;  donepezil showed only minor, short-term benefits and was associated with significant side effects.

Intervention 
Current evidence suggests that cognition-based interventions do improve mental performance (i.e. memory, executive function, attention, and speed) in older adults and people with mild cognitive impairment. Especially, immediate and delayed verbal recall resulted in higher performance gains from memory training.

Nutrition 
There is currently limited evidence to form a strong conclusion to recommend the use of any form of carbohydrate in preventing or reducing cognitive decline in older adults with normal cognition or mild cognitive impairment. So, more large and higher quality evidence is needed to evaluate memory improvement and find nutritional issues due to carbohydrates.

Outlook

MCI does not usually interfere with daily life, but around 50 percent of people diagnosed with it go on to develop Alzheimer's disease within five years (mainly for people diagnosed with memory impairments). This diagnosis can also serve as an early indicator for other types of dementia, although MCI may remain stable or even remit.

Prevalence 

The prevalence of MCI varies by age. The prevalence of MCI among different age groups is as follows: 6.7% for ages 60–64; 8.4% for ages 65–69, 10.1% for ages 70–74, 14.8% for ages 75–79, and 25.2% for ages 80–84. After a two-year follow-up, the cumulative incidence of dementia among individuals who are over 65 years old and were diagnosed with MCI was found to be 14.9%. 

Due to the emphasis shifting to the earlier diagnosis of dementia, more people are assessed who report memory problems. In turn this also leads diagnosing more people who might have MCI which is a risk factor for dementia. Globally, approximately 16% of the population over the age of 70 experiences some type of mild cognitive impairment.

See also 

 Menopause-related cognitive impairment – similar symptoms, appears shortly after menopause, and can be treated with hormone replacement therapy

References 

Alzheimer's disease
Cognitive disorders
Learning disabilities